Center Township is one of eleven townships in Ripley County, Indiana. As of the 2010 census, its population was 2,657 and it contained 1,151 housing units.

History
Straber Ford Bridge was listed on the National Register of Historic Places in 2009.

Geography

Cities and towns
 Osgood

Unincorporated towns
 Otter Village

Education
Center Township residents may obtain a free library card from the Osgood Public Library Central Library in Osgood, or its branch in Milan.

References

External links

Townships in Ripley County, Indiana
Townships in Indiana